Orø is a small island in Denmark located in the Isefjord.

Administratively the island belongs to Holbæk Municipality.

There are four villages on Orø: Bybjerg, the largest village on the island with a population of 267 (1 January 2021), Brønde, Gamløse and Næsby.

It is a popular vacation area with some 1,200 summer houses.

There is a ferry connection between Orø and Holbæk, and a cable ferry connects the island to Hammer Bakke (Hammer Hill) on the Hornsherred peninsula.

Orø Church dating back to the 12th century and Orø Museum depicting local life in the area are national monuments.

References

External links
website

Islands of Denmark
Geography of Holbæk Municipality